West Briton may refer to:

West Brit, a pejorative term for an Irish person alleged to be excessively sympathetic to or imitative of the British
The West Briton, a local newspaper published in Truro, Cornwall, England
A person from Wales (obsolete usage)